Mellen City Hall is a city hall in Mellen, Wisconsin, United States, which was added to the National Register of Historic Places in 1979.  A restored Victorian structure, it still serves as the home of the city government, as well as the Mellen Historical Society and the Mellen Museum.

Notes 

Buildings and structures in Ashland County, Wisconsin
City and town halls on the National Register of Historic Places in Wisconsin
City halls in Wisconsin
National Register of Historic Places in Ashland County, Wisconsin